Samar Haj Hassan, (born in 1964) was a Jordanian politician and activist for women’s rights, a former member of the Jordanian Senate and currently serves as a commissioner in the Independent Election Commission (Jordan). She also currently serves on the Royal Committee to Modernise the Political System and is appointed the President of the Women’s Empowerment sub-committee.

Early life
Samar Haj Hassan was born in Amman, Jordan and studied International Business and Marketing in Switzerland.

Career
Haj Hassan founded Mahara Professional Consultancies in Development, which provides services in the field of social and human development. She served in and advised several national committees and programs in the field of family affairs and was a member of the 25th Jordanian Senate.

In 2007, Haj Hassan bid for a seat in the Parliament of Jordan in the Amman governorate as an independent candidate.

In 2014, Haj Hassan was appointed as a member of the Independent Election Commission (Jordan). Haj Hassan was reappointed to the Independent Election Commission (Jordan) in 2016  and currently serves as the only woman in the commission.

In January 2021, Haj Hassan was appointed as member of the European Centre for Electoral Support's Strategic and Advisory Committee.

References 

Members of the Senate of Jordan
People from Amman
1964 births
Living people
21st-century Jordanian women politicians
21st-century Jordanian politicians